Qədiməlikqışlaq (also, Qədiməliqışlaq, Kadimalikyshlak, and Kadmalykyshlakh) is a village in the Khachmaz Rayon of Azerbaijan.  The village forms part of the municipality of Qaracik Zeyid.

References 

Populated places in Khachmaz District